Department of Administrative Services may refer to one of the following government agencies:

Australia
Department of Administrative Services (1975)
Department of Administrative Services (1975–1984)
Department of Local Government and Administrative Services (1984–1987)
Department of Administrative Services (1987–1993)
Department of the Arts and Administrative Services (1993–1994)
Department of Administrative Services (1994–1997)

United States
Connecticut Department of Administrative Services
New Hampshire Department of Administrative Services
New York City Department of Citywide Administrative Services
Ohio Department of Administrative Services
Oregon Department of Administrative Services